God Help Me is a 2006 American Christian direct-to-video romantic comedy film written and produced by Dan Olds. It was directed by Reece Tedford, and stars Tom Miner, George Moss, Jim Anderson, Candace Orrino and Shelley Findley. The film was produced by Dust Storm Productions, and distributed on July 13, 2006 by CustomFlix.

Plot
Trudy is the girl of Ryan's dreams, but Trudy is waiting for God to tell her who she should marry; Ryan is not what she had in mind. When Ryan's friends discover this they create a plan behind Ryan's back to convince Trudy that God has chosen her to be with Ryan. With less than brilliant ideas, each plan backfires and each scheme gets more ridiculous. As his friends Jack, Lon, and Bridgett dig themselves deeper into trouble, they try to rationalize and justify each scheme to convince Trudy.

Cast
 Tom Miner as Ryan
 George Moss as Jack
 Jim Anderson as Lon
 Candace Orrino as Bridgett
 Shelley Findley as Trudy

Production
God Help Me started when producer Dan Olds wrote the screenplay, and he later worked with Duststorm Productions on preparation of film. The project was financed with $15,000, and the production was very low-budget. The movie was shot in Missouri and mostly used local cast and crew. It was shot over a period of fourteen days.

Reception
Brett Hunt of the Seattle Post-Intelligencer gave the film a mixed review, saying, "I think to a Christian audience this might be an ok movie..." The film won the "Best Film Under $25,000" award at the Creation Arts Festival.

References

External links
 
 God Help Me at The Dove Foundation

Films about evangelicalism
2006 films
American romantic comedy films
2006 romantic comedy films
2000s English-language films
2000s American films